Group B of the 2019 FIFA Women's World Cup took place from 8 to 17 June 2019. The group consisted of China PR, Germany, South Africa and Spain. The top two teams, Germany and Spain, along with the third-placed team, China PR (as one of the four best third-placed teams), advanced to the round of 16.

Teams

Notes

Standings

In the round of 16:
 The winners of Group B, Germany, advanced to play the third-placed team of Group A, Nigeria.
 The runners-up of Group B, Spain, advanced to play the winners of Group F, the United States.
 The third-placed team of Group B, China PR, advanced to play the winners of Group C, Italy (as one of the four best third-placed teams).

Matches
All times listed are local, CEST (UTC+2).

Germany vs China PR

Spain vs South Africa

Germany vs Spain

South Africa vs China PR

South Africa vs Germany

China PR vs Spain

Discipline
Fair play points would have been used as tiebreakers in the group if the overall and head-to-head records of teams were tied, or if teams had the same record in the ranking of third-placed teams. These were calculated based on yellow and red cards received in all group matches as follows:
first yellow card: minus 1 point;
indirect red card (second yellow card): minus 3 points;
direct red card: minus 4 points;
yellow card and direct red card: minus 5 points;

Only one of the above deductions were applied to a player in a single match.

References

External links
 
 2019 FIFA Women's World Cup Group B, FIFA.com

2019 FIFA Women's World Cup
Germany at the 2019 FIFA Women's World Cup
China at the 2019 FIFA Women's World Cup
Spain at the 2019 FIFA Women's World Cup
South Africa at the 2019 FIFA Women's World Cup